Preloge is a settlement in the Municipality of Slovenska Bistrica in northeastern Slovenia. It lies on the regional road leading southwest from Slovenska Bistrica to Slovenske Konjice. The area is part of the traditional region of Styria. It is now included with the rest of the municipality in the Drava Statistical Region.

References

External links
Preloge at Geopedia

Populated places in the Municipality of Slovenska Bistrica